Susan Nwokedi is a Nigerian-American filmmaker, writer, producer, actor, educator, and businessman. Nwokedi wrote and produced Mind of the Enemy, which received an award nomination for Best Original Soundtrack at the Nollywood & African Film Critics' Awards in 2013.

Early life 
Nwokedi was born in Nigeria and moved to Houston, Texas as a small child. When Nwokedi was in high school, she had her first taste of the film industry when she worked in several Hollywood films. After learning first-hand what it took to be in the film industry, Nwokedi went on to produce and direct several films. Nwokedi also worked as a writer and educator. After high school, she earned a Bachelor of Arts degree in Theatre Arts at the University of Houston and later earned a Master of Science Degree in Education in Media Design and Technology - Film from Full Sail University in Florida. She also obtained a second master's degree in Educational Leadership from the University of St. Thomas.

Career 
In 2008, Nwokedi created TopLine Productions and Entertainment, Co. LLC. (TopLine), a production company specializing in quality film and television/media productions. In the same year, Nwokedi played Teresa in the Nollywood film, Ricochet, that she also co-wrote and executive produced. In 2009, Nwokedi produced Blood N' Destiny, followed by Secret Past in 2011.  In 2012, her internationally acclaimed feature film Mind of the Enemy Premiered in Nigeria and the U.S. The film was also shot on location in Abuja, Nigeria and featured some of the biggest names of the time in the Nollywood industry.  Nwokedi has written, produced, directed, and appeared in many films both in house and non in house productions.

Personal life and other projects 
Besides being a filmmaker, Nwokedi is also an educator. She resides in the state of Texas, with her family. Nwokedi completed an Education Leadership Program at the University of St. Thomas, and is a certified school principal and instructional leader.  She worked as a classroom teacher for over 10 years at Fort Bend Independent School District. In 2010, Nwokedi founded Children Come Click Education and Technology Center, (CCC), a supplemental education program that specializes in helping learners of all age reach their academic goals.  She also serves as administrator for Acting for All (AFA), an enrichment program that uses acting and arts to help children and adults build reading, writing, acting,  communication skills, and confidence.  She believes in sharing her talents with others, regardless of their demographic and location. Her advice for anyone interested in being in the film industry is to get out there and get involved in the filmmaking process, because even if it doesn't pay yet, you will have learned what it takes to make a film.

Awards, nominations, and recognition 
September 2013- Nwokedi was nominated Best Original Soundtrack for Mind of the Enemy at the Nollywood & African Film Critics' Awards.
May 2013- Nwokedi was honored at Trendy Africa Magazine Mothers Appreciation Event for her community service and outstanding achievements in a chosen career.
August 2015- Best actress in Mind of the Enemy at L.A.N.F.A.
 August 2016- Best film Mind of the Enemy at L.A.N.F.A
 October 2017  -TFN Esther Rolle Image Award

Filmography

References

External links 
 
 http://nollywoodexpress.com/tag/susan-nwokedi/
 http://issuu.com/c47houston/docs/c47houstonmarch2009
Mind of the Enemy official trailer
Juliet Ibrahim, Afua Sam,Regina Onyeibe,Susan Nwokedi others to be honoured in Dallas on May 4

American people of Nigerian descent
American filmmakers
Living people
Year of birth missing (living people)